Mansa Mahmud II, also known as Mamadou, was mansa ("king of kings") of the Mali Empire from 1481 to 1496.  

Mansa Mahmud II's rule was characterized by more losses to Mali's old possessions and increased contact between Mali and Portuguese explorers along the coast. In 1477, the Yatenga emperor Nasséré makes yet another Mossi raid into Macina, this time conquering it and the old province of BaGhana (Wagadou). In 1481, Fula raids against Mali's Tekrur provinces begin.

The growing trade in Mali's western provinces with Portugal witnessed the exchange of envoys between the two nations. Mansa Mahmud II received the Portuguese envoy Pedro da Évora in 1484. In the letter he sent back to King John II of Portugal, Mahmud claimed to be exceeded in power by only the sultans of Yemen, Baghdad, Cairo and Takrur.

Mali lost control of Jalu during this period. Meanwhile, Songhai seizes the salt mines of Taghazza in 1493.  That same year, Mahmud II sent another envoy to the Portuguese proposing alliance against the Fulas.  The Portuguese decide to stay out of the conflict and the talks conclude by 1495 without an alliance.

See also
Mali Empire
Keita Dynasty

References

Year of birth missing
Year of death missing
Mansas of Mali
15th-century monarchs in Africa
Keita family